Axel Berg may refer to:

 Axel Berg (architect) (born 1856), Danish architect
 Axel Berg (politician) (born 1959), German politician

See also 
 Aksel Berg (1893–1979), Soviet scientist and engineer